The Second Roman–Dacian War was fought between 105 to 106 because the Dacian King, Decebalus, had broken his peace terms with the Roman Emperor Trajan from the First Dacian War.

Before the War
Following his subjugation, Decebalus complied with Rome for a time, but was soon inciting revolt among tribes against them.

The war
At the start of the war, Trajan built another bridge over the Danube to move his legions faster into Dacia. Unlike the first war, the second war involved several skirmishes that proved costly to the Roman military, who, facing large numbers of allied tribes, struggled to attain a decisive victory. Trajan was not deterred by these constant setbacks however; more and more Roman legions crossed Trajan`s Bridge into Dacia and gradually Trajan`s army began to push northward. An assault against the capital Sarmisegetusa took place at the beginning of the summer of 106 with the participation of the legions II Adiutrix and IV Flavia Felix and a detachment (vexillatio) from Legio VI Ferrata (see also Battle of Sarmisegetusa). The Dacians repelled the first attack, but the Romans destroyed the water pipes to the Dacian capital. The city was burned to the ground. Decebalus committed suicide rather than face capture by the Romans. Nevertheless, the war went on. Due to the treason of a confidant of the Dacian King, Bicilis, the Romans found Decebalus's treasure in the River Sargesia – a fortune estimated at 165,500 kg of gold and 331,000 kg of silver. The last battle with the army of the Dacian king took place at Porolissum.

Aftermath

In 113, Trajan built Trajan's Column near the Colosseum in Rome to commemorate his victory. Although the Romans conquered the ancient Kingdom of Dacia, a large remainder of the land remained outside of Roman Imperial authority. Additionally, the conquest changed the balance of power in the region and was the catalyst for a renewed alliance of Germanic and Celtic tribes and kingdoms against the Roman Empire. However, within the annexed territory and surrounds, the material advantages of being part of the Roman Imperial system wasn't lost on the majority of the surviving Dacian aristocracy. Thus began the process by which most modern Romanian historians and linguists believe that many of the Dacians subsequently became romanized (see also Origin of Romanians).

See also
 First Dacian War
 Trajan's Dacian Wars
 Trajan
 Roman Dacia
 Decebalus

References

Bibliography
 Scarre, Chris, The Penguin Historical Atlas of Ancient Rome
 

Trajan's Dacian Wars
105
106